UC may refer to:

Education

In the United States
 University of California system
 University of California, Berkeley, its flagship university
 University of Charleston, West Virginia
 University of Chicago, Illinois
 University of Cincinnati, Ohio
 Upsala College, East Orange, New Jersey (defunct since 1995)
 Utica College, Utica, New York
 Harvard Undergraduate Council, Harvard College's student government body
 University college

In other countries
 Pontifical Catholic University of Chile
 University of Canberra, Australia
 University of Cantabria, Spain
 University of Canterbury, New Zealand
 University of Cebu, Cebu City, Philippines
 University of Coimbra, Portugal
 University of the Cordilleras, Baguio, Philippines
 Uva College, Badulla, Sri Lanka
 Uxbridge College, England
 University of Calgary, Canada

Science, technology, and mathematics

Biology and medicine
 Ulcerative colitis, a type of inflammatory bowel disease
 Umbilical cord
 Unassisted childbirth, birth without the aid of professional birth attendants

Computing and telecommunication
 UC Browser, a web browser for mobile devices
 UC Mobile, a Chinese software company
 Universal composability, a cryptographic model for protocols
 Microcontroller (abbreviated "uC" or "μC"), a computer-on-a-chip used to control electronic devices
 Unified communications, the integration of real-time communication services

Other uses in science, technology, and mathematics
 UC (noise reduction) (Universal Compatible/Universal Compander), a vinyl record noise reduction system in the 1980s
 German Type UC submarine (disambiguation)
 German submarine U-C of WW2
 Danish UC submarines (disambiguation) of Peter Madsen
 Culver UC, a US Navy unmanned target drone
 Ultrasonic consolidation, an additive manufacturing technology
 Uranium carbide, a hard refractive ceramic material
 Uniform polyhedron compound, a type of geometry
 Universal Column, a type of H-beam
 Folding boxboard, a paperboard grade
 Undercarriage, also known as landing gear, on aircraft
 Photon upconversion, an optical phenomenon

Arts and entertainment
 University Challenge, a popular British quiz programme airing on BBC Two
 University Challenge (New Zealand), the New Zealand version of the British programme
 Universal Century, one of the timelines of the Gundam anime metaseries

Other uses
 Centrist Union group, a parliamentary group in the French Senate
 Undercover, the practice of disguising one's identity for the purposes of a police investigation or espionage
 Unified Cornish, a variety of the Cornish language
 Union councils of Pakistan
 Unit cost, a business measure
 United Center, a sports arena in Chicago
 Universal Credit, a British social security benefit
 University City, a neighborhood in northern San Diego
 Upper case, in orthography and typography, denoting large or capital letters
 Urban Council, a municipal council in Hong Kong
 Unification Church, a new religious movement originally founded in South Korea
 Uc, a classification formerly used by the British Board of Film Classification until 2009

See also 
 U of C (disambiguation)
 University College (disambiguation), the name of several universities